Han Song-ryol (born 17 June 1954) is a Vice Foreign Minister at North Korea's Ministry of Foreign Affairs.
Previously, he served as the deputy chief of North Korea's mission to the United Nations from 2002 to 2006. In February 2015, he was appointed as director-general of the U.S. affairs department at North Korea's Foreign Ministry.

References

Living people
Place of birth missing (living people)
1954 births
North Korean diplomats
Anti-Americanism
Foreign ministers of North Korea